Arthur Caesar (9 March 1892 – 20 June 1953) was a Romanian-American screenwriter and brother of the songwriter Irving Caesar. Caesar first started writing Hollywood films in 1924. Most of his films were in the B-movie category. He won an Academy Award for the story of Manhattan Melodrama (1934), which is most famous today for being the film that John Dillinger had just seen before getting gunned down outside the cinema.

Selected filmography
 His Darker Self (1924)
 Napoleon's Barber (1928)
 The Aviator (1929)
 She Couldn't Say No (1930)
 The Life of the Party (1930)
 Gold Dust Gertie (1931)
 Side Show (1931)
 Manhattan Melodrama (1934)
 Atlantic City (1944)
 I Accuse My Parents (1944)
 Three of a Kind (1944)

External links

1892 births
1953 deaths
Romanian Jews
American people of Romanian-Jewish descent
Romanian emigrants to the United States
Romanian screenwriters
Best Story Academy Award winners
20th-century American screenwriters